Lasse Emil Nielsen (born 8 November 1993), simply known as Emil Nielsen, is a Danish professional footballer who plays as a forward for USL Championship club Orange County SC.

Career
Growing up in Store Merløse, Nielsen started playing for local side, MUK before being signed to the youth academy of FC Roskilde. After making the first team, he helped Roskilde reach promotion to the Danish second tier during the 2013–14 season. He featured regularly for the club, ending the season with a staggering 34 goals, making him the topscorer of the division.

On 7 July 2014, Nielsen joined Norwegian Eliteserien club Rosenborg. After making only five appearances for Rosenborg in his first season, Nielsen joined AGF on 31 August 2015 on a one-year loan deal with the option for a permanent contract. His time in Aarhus was marred by injuries and he only made four appearances during the season, scoring one goal. At the end of the season, AGF did not pick up the buy option and he returned to Rosenborg. Upon his return, Rosenborg-coach Kåre Ingebrigtsen expressed that, considering the club's strength at the winger position, it would be difficult for Nielsen to find his way into the squad, and that a solution had to be found.

On 17 August 2016, Nielsen rejoined Danish 1st Division club FC Roskilde on a two-year contract, hoping to refind his old form after only making 15 total appearances in two seasons. His time in Roskilde was a success, and in his final season in the club he scored 20 goals in 29 appearances. His performances earned him the 2019 Danish 1st Division Player of the Year Award.

On 27 June 2019, Nielsen joined Lyngby Boldklub one a three-year contract. He suffered relegation to the Danish 1st Division with the club on 9 May 2021 after a loss to last placed AC Horsens.

On 2 January 2023, it was announced that Nielsen had signed with Orange County SC of the USL Championship.

Career statistics

Club

Honours

Individual 
Danish 2nd Division top scorer: 2013–14 (33 goals)
Danish 1st Division top scorer: 2018–19 (20 goals) [joint with Ronnie Schwartz]

References

External links 

Emil Nielsen on DBU

Living people
1993 births
Danish men's footballers
Denmark youth international footballers
FC Roskilde players
Rosenborg BK players
Lyngby Boldklub players
Aarhus Gymnastikforening players
Orange County SC players
Eliteserien players
Danish Superliga players
Danish 1st Division players
Danish 2nd Division players
Danish expatriate men's footballers
Expatriate footballers in Norway
Expatriate soccer players in the United States
Danish expatriate sportspeople in Norway
Danish expatriate sportspeople in the United States
Association football forwards
People from Holbæk Municipality
Sportspeople from Region Zealand